Arco Vara AS is an Estonian real estate company. It is one of the leading real estate development companies in the Baltics. The company's main activity is real estate development, including real estate appraisal, construction and administration.

Arco Vara AS has offices in four countries: Estonia, Latvia, Ukraine and Bulgaria.

Arco Vara AS was established on 14 June 1994 (Arco Vara Kinnasvarabüroo was established on 14 February 1992).

Since 2007, Arco Vara AS is listed in Nasdaq Tallinn.

References

External links
 

Companies of Estonia